Pandami, officially the Municipality of Pandami (Tausūg: Kawman sin Pandami), is a 4th class municipality in the province of Sulu, Philippines. According to the 2020 census, it has a population of 33,177 people.

Geography

Barangays
Pandami is politically subdivided into 16 barangays.

Climate

Demographics

Economy

References

External links
Pandami Profile at PhilAtlas.com
[ Philippine Standard Geographic Code]
Pandami Profile at the DTI Cities and Municipalities Competitive Index
Philippine Census Information
Local Governance Performance Management System

Municipalities of Sulu
Island municipalities in the Philippines